The Time Has Come is the debut album by American psychedelic soul band the Chambers Brothers. Released by Columbia Records in 1967, it features their hit "Time Has Come Today".

Critical reception
The album was referred to as a "ground-breaking album" by the authors of Shining Star: Braving the Elements of Earth, Wind & Fire. In a short review of the album, Music On Vinyl referred to it as a perfect blend of soul and garage.

Commercial performance
On December 14, 1968, at its 27th week on the Billboard chart, it peaked at no. 6. According to the December 21, 1968 issue of Billboard, along with Parsley, Sage, Rosemary and Thyme by Simon and Garfunkel, their album was one of the 36 Columbia albums that held a position in the top five that year. International online magazine PopMatters said the album ascended to number four on Billboards pop albums chart. It was no. 79 on the Cashbox Top 100 Pop Albums in 1968.

Track list

Personnel
The Chambers Brothers
George Chambers
Joseph Chambers
Lester Chambers
Willie Chambers
Brian Keenan
Technical
Jim Marshall - photography

References

External links
 All Music: The Time Has Come

The Chambers Brothers albums
1968 albums
Albums produced by Dave Rubinson
Columbia Records albums